Plesiocystiscus jansseni is a species of sea snail, a marine gastropod mollusk, in the family Cystiscidae.

References

jansseni
Gastropods described in 1988